Town Talk may refer to:

 The Town Talk (established 1883), a newspaper in Alexandria, Louisiana
 Town Talk, California, an unincorporated community in Nevada County, California
 Town Talk (TV series), an Australian TV series aired in Sydney in 1957